Lyogyrus granum, common name the squat duskysnail, is a species of very small or minute freshwater snail with a gill and an operculum, an aquatic gastropod mollusk in the family Hydrobiidae.

Distribution and conservation status 
This species of snail lives in New Brunswick and in Nova Scotia in Canada. It was categorized as "Data Deficient" (DD) by the Committee on the Status of Endangered Wildlife in Canada (COSEWIC).

References

Hydrobiidae